The Battle off Zuwarah (19/20 January 1943) was a naval night encounter during the Second World War. An Italian flotilla of small minesweepers and auxiliary vessels evacuating Tripoli was destroyed by two British destroyers.

Background
On the night of 19/20 January, the British destroyers  and  patrolled off Zuwarah, Libya to cut off the escape of the last Italian ships from Tripoli.

Prelude
On the night of 19/20 January, the British destroyers Kelvin and Javelin patrolled off Zuwarah, Libya to cut off the escape of the last Italian ships from Tripoli. The Type 271 radar on Javelin detected ships heading towards the Tunisian coast from the direction of Tripoli. The ships were the Tripoli minesweeping flotilla (Lieutenant Giuseppe Di Bartolo), which had been ordered to leave the city for Tunisia and then to Italy, to avoid capture. The flotilla was made up of four small minesweeping tugs (RD 31, RD 36, RD 37 and RD 39, of which RD 36 and 37 had Italian  crews); the trawler Scorfano (the largest ship in the convoy); the small tanker Irma; the auxiliary minesweepers DM 12 Guglielmo Marconi (a requisitioned brigantine); R 26 Angelo Musco and R 224 Cinzia (two former fishing vessels); the auxiliary patrol vessel V 66 Astrea (a motor sailing vessel) and the pump boat S. Barbara (towed by Scorfano).

Battle

Javelin and Kelvin moved to intercept the Italian ships and fired star shells to illuminate the ships. The British mistook the vessels for an Italian convoy. The Italians, under heavy fire, were able neither to fight back effectively (the RD minesweepers being armed with a 76 mm gun and two 6.5 mm machine-guns each, while the other ships carried only machine guns) nor to escape (having lower speed than the destroyers). RD 36, the flotilla leader, tried to cover the retreat of the other ships but was soon sunk with all hands. The other vessels, fleeing towards the coast to allow their crews to escape, were picked off one-by-one. RD 37 and Scorfano were sunk with no survivors; Marconi was set on fire but all of her crew escaped before she sank and Irma was finished off with a torpedo.

Aftermath

Analysis
By the morning of 20 January, the flotilla had been annihilated. Kelvin had expended 300 rounds of her 4.7-inch guns and Javelin 500 rounds. Javelin and Kelvin quickly headed for Malta, where they arrived safely the next day. RD 36 and its crew were awarded the Gold Medal of Military Valour for the action against overwhelming odds.

Casualties
The Italians suffered  casualties and the survivors either swam ashore or were picked up by Italian vessels the next day.

Footnotes

References

Further reading
 
 

Battle of the Tripoli Convoy
1943 in Italy
Naval battles of World War II involving Italy
Zuwarah
Conflicts in 1943
January 1943 events